Torbaaz (transl. Black Falcon) is a 2020 Indian Hindi-language action thriller film directed by Girish Malik. Sanjay Dutt plays the role of a medical professional that lost his wife and son while he was placed in the Indian Embassy in Kabul, while Nargis Fakhri and Rahul Dev play other prominent characters. Torbaaz was earlier scheduled for a theatrical release, which could not happen owing to the COVID-19 pandemic, after which the makers confirmed its distribution contract with Netflix. It was premiered on 11 December 2020 on Netflix.

Plot
Naseer is an ex-army doctor who is visiting a refugee camp in Afghanistan. Whilst he is there, he recalls how he lost his wife and young son to a suicide terrorist attack, during his placement at the Indian Embassy, in Kabul. He, alongside Ayesha, work together to run his late wife’s NGO. Naseer tries to bring joy to the children in the camp, through cricket. He tries to make a team of displaced boys that were victims of the Afghan war. Naseer tries to get the boys to work together and put aside their differences through cricket. He constantly faces the threat of Qazar and his men, who want to use the boys as soldiers and suicide bombers.

Cast
Sanjay Dutt as Naseer
Nargis Fakhri as Ayesha
Rahul Dev as Qazar
Fahim Fazli as Majed Taliban commander
Gavie Chahal as Shariyar Khan
Kuwaarjeet Chopraa as Habibullah
Humayoon Shams Khan as Raghu 
 Sneha Namanandi as Fawzia
Rahul Mittra as Col Khan
Rakshit wahi as dawlatzaahi
Priyanka Verma as Meera
Vansh Sayani as one of the boys in the group
Rockey Raina as Abdullah
Kourosh Torbat Zadeh as Sajadi

Production

Torbaaz was announced in September 2016. Nargis Fakhri was roped in for lead role after Sanjay Dutt.

Principal photography begun in December 2017. After shooting in Afghanistan, Torbaaz was majorly filmed in Bishkek, Kyrgyzstan becoming the first Indian film shot there.

Other filming locations included Mumbai, Manali (Himachal Pradesh) and Punjab, India.

Release
Initially planned for a May 2019 theatrical release, Torbaaz was postponed to mid-2020, but due to cinemas shut down owing to COVID-19 pandemic, it was not able to release that time too. In July 2020, it was decided that Torbaaz was directly released online. It was released on 11 December 2020 on Netflix who purchased its digital and distribution rights.

References

External links 
 
 Torbaaz on Bollywood Hungama

Indian action drama films
Indian action thriller films
Indian sports drama films
Films set in Afghanistan
War in Afghanistan (2001–2021) films
Films shot in Asia
Hindi-language Netflix original films
Indian direct-to-video films
Films not released in theaters due to the COVID-19 pandemic
Films shot in Afghanistan
Films shot in Mumbai
Films shot in Manali, Himachal Pradesh
Films shot in Punjab, India
Works about the Taliban
Films about jihadism
Films about cricket in India